Abdullah Ahmed Khan (born 1990) professionally known as Sanki or Sanki King is a Pakistani graffiti, calligraffiti and street artist, occasionally painting live as part of his exhibits, and collaborating with fashion designers featuring his artwork. He has also works in sneaker art, sticker art, b-boying and parkour in Pakistan.

Early life
Sanki was born in Jeddah, Saudi Arabia and raised in Karachi, Pakistan. His father worked at the Islamic Development Bank. Both his art teachers and father encouraged him to pursue art. He was also interested in BMX, boxing and floor gymnastics.

Career
While playing Counter-Strike as a teenager, another player described him as ‘Sanki’ (eccentric, slightly mad) and he adopted it as his moniker. The artist claims it also means 'deep thinker'. In 2008, Sanki started his career as a professional performing artist after being photographed by Tapu Javeri while freerunning in a park in Karachi, later performing at the launch of Style 360. From 2011, he became a professional artist, selling artwork and painting commissioned murals, and in March 2012 started his own personal studio where he works .

Graffiti

Sanki did "live graffiti art" for the first time in Pakistan in July 2012 and in the same month launched his Sticker Art Movement through designs which feature Muhammad Ali Jinnah, the founder of Pakistan. In December 2012, he was chosen as the judge for a nationwide graffiti competition spread across seven cities. Some of his well-known works include Love Karachi on a bus and another, titled Flying Kiss which he painted outside the Arts Council of Pakistan in 2013. He painted the tallest graffiti in Pakistan in 2014 at the Valika Cricket Ground, University of Karachi. His creations can be seen in the areas Nazimabad, North Nazimabad, Zamzama and Clifton outside the Sanat Gallery, painted at the opening of his very first solo exhibition, "You should know him by now", on the 4th of June 2016.

King is the only Pakistani artist to have been invited to graffiti crews Beyond Mankind Krew (BMK, founded 1991, Queens, New York City) and Experienced Vandals (Ex-Vandals, founded 1979, Brooklyn). Ex-Vandals is one of the first graffiti crews in the world. Sanki's work is featured in Nicholas Ganz’s book, Street Messages, published in April 2015. In 2017, he collaborated with Mumbai-based artist Zeenat Kulavoor for Urdu calligraphic conversation project Pehle Aap. He also participated in Karachi Biennale 2017 with his work Mind Palace.

Custom-painting and fashion
Sanki King is known for his graffiti art designs for sneakers, using paint, marker pens and stencils. He now runs his own company making custom-painted sneakers and apparel, as well as organizing dance and graffiti workshops.

In 2014, Sanki worked for the first time with a local designer brand Zeb-Tan. He collaborated with The House of Arsalan Iqbal for the collection ‘Desirably Distressed’, which came out in March 2015. He said, “In 2012, I painted a shutter in Arsalan Iqbal’s store. Since Iqbal travels a lot, he finds graffiti very inspiring. Then in May 2014 we worked on a collaborative venture for the next 10 months”  Another collection of footwear and jewellery incorporating his designs "Devolution Chic" was showcased a month later at the 8th PFDC Sunsilk Fashion Week 2015.

B-boying and parkour
In 2008, King began a b-boying crew in Karachi who organized as Unknown Crew (UC) in 2010. They have performed for Jaag TV (previously known as CNBC Pakistan), HP Inc, Caltex, Play TV, Lux Style Awards and a number of music videos.

Personal life
Sanki King lives and works in Karachi.

See also
 List of street artists

References

Sources
 
 
 
 
 
 

Books

External links

Facebook

Living people
Pakistani graffiti artists
1990 births
Street artists
Pakistani contemporary artists
21st-century Pakistani painters
Artists from Karachi
Traceurs